Helen Wells (1910–1986) was the author of nurse Cherry Ames books, a series for young teens. She wrote volumes #1–7 and #17–27. She was also the author of the first four Vicki Barr books and possibly the last Vicki Barr book.

External links 
 
 
The Cherry Ames page
List of Cherry Ames books
Helen Wells

1910 births
1986 deaths
American fiction writers
20th-century American novelists
American women novelists
20th-century American women writers